Dennis Marriott (29 November 1939 – 5 December 2014) was an English cricketer. He played first-class cricket for Middlesex and Surrey.

See also
 List of Middlesex County Cricket Club players
 List of Surrey County Cricket Club players

References

External links
 

1939 births
2014 deaths
English cricketers
Middlesex cricketers
Surrey cricketers